C. W. McCall & Co. is country musician C. W. McCall's sixth and last album of original songs, released on Polydor Records in 1979 (see 1979 in music), before McCall (or, more accurately, Bill Fries, the man playing his role) announced his retirement from the music industry. Out of the ten tracks, only one ("The Little Things in Life") was written as a collaboration between McCall and Chip Davis, Fries's songwriting partner, while one other, "Silver Cloud Breakdown", was composed by Davis several years earlier and was featured in the movie Convoy, though it was not present on its soundtrack.

Track listing
 "Outlaws and Lone Star Beer" (Bob Duncan, John Durril) – 1:56
 "Wheels of Fortune" (Terry Skinner, J.L. Wallace)
 "City of New Orleans" (Steve Goodman)
 "The Little Things in Life" (Bill Fries, Chip Davis) – 2:43
 "The Cowboy" (Ron Agnew)
 "Milton" (Agnew)
 "Flowers on the Wall" (Lew DeWitt)
 "Silver Cloud Breakdown" (Fries, Davis)
 "I Wish There was More That I Could Give" (Walt Meskell, Tim Martin)
 "Hobo's Lullaby" (Goebel Reeves)

Personnel

 C. W. McCall - Vocals, Design
 Jackson Berkey, Walt Meskell, Ron Agnew, Gary Morris, Sarah Westphalen, Ruth Horn, Milton E. Bailey III Esq. - Vocals
 Chip Davis - Vocals, Drums, Percussion, Producer, Arranger
 Jackson Berkey - Keyboards
 Eric Hansen - Bass
 Ron Agnew - 6-String Guitar
 Walt Meskell - 6-String Guitar, National Guitar, Banjo
 Steve Hanson - Banjo
 Ron Cooley - 6-String Guitar, 12-String Guitar, Electric Guitar
 Steve Basore - Steel Guitar
 Steve Shipps, Sue Robinson, David Lowe, Dorothy Brown, Hugh Brown, Miriam Dufflemeyer, Lucinda Gladics, James Hammond, Joe Landes, Beth McCollum, Merton Shatzkin, Alex Sokol - Strings

Additional personnel

 Don Sears - Producer, Engineer
 Jim Wheeler, John Boyd, Ron Ubel - Engineers
 Dudycha & Associates, Inc. - Art Direction and Production

Charts

Singles - Billboard (North America)

External links
 NarrowGauge.org album information for C. W. McCall & Co.

C. W. McCall albums
1979 albums
Polydor Records albums